Gresham Middle School may refer to:

 Gresham Middle School (Tennessee), Fountain City, Knoxville, Tennessee, U.S.

See also
 Gresham High School (disambiguation)
 Gresham's School, Holt, Norfolk, England
 Grisham Middle School, Round Rock, Texas, U.S.